Seneca's Day is a 2016 Lithuanian drama film directed by . It was selected as the Lithuanian entry for the Best Foreign Language Film at the 89th Academy Awards but it was not nominated.

Cast
 Ina Marija Bartaité
 Dainius Gavenonis
 Elzbieta Latenaite
 Mait Malmsten
 Marijus Mazunas

See also
 List of submissions to the 89th Academy Awards for Best Foreign Language Film
 List of Lithuanian submissions for the Academy Award for Best Foreign Language Film

References

External links
 

2016 films
2016 drama films
Lithuanian-language films
2010s Russian-language films
Estonian-language films
Lithuanian drama films
Latvian drama films
Estonian drama films